Buddhism is among the smallest minority-religions in Canada, with a very slowly growing population in the country, partly the result of conversion, with only 4.6% of new immigrants identifying themselves as Buddhist. As of 2021, the census recorded 356,975 or 0.8% of the population.

History
Buddhism has been practised in Canada for more than a century. Buddhism arrived in Canada with the arrival of Chinese labourers in the territories during the 19th century. Modern Buddhism in Canada traces to Japanese immigration during the late 19th century. The first Japanese Buddhist temple in Canada was built at the Ishikawa Hotel in Vancouver in 1905. Over time, the Japanese Jōdo Shinshū branch of Buddhism became the prevalent form of Buddhism in Canada and established the largest Buddhist organization in Canada.

A substantial expansion of Buddhism in Canada began in the last half of the 20th century. Changes in Canadian immigration and refugee policies corresponded to increasing communities from Sri Lanka, Japan, and Southeast Asian nations with Buddhist traditions. In addition, the popularity and goodwill ushered in by Tibet's Dalai Lama (who has been made an honorary Canadian citizen) put Buddhism in a favourable light. Many non-Asian Canadians (Namgyal Rinpoche, Glenn H. Mullin, and Richard Barron for instance) have embraced Buddhism in various traditions and some have become leaders in their respective sanghas.

In 2012, there were 489 Buddhist organizations in Canada, including temples, centres, associations, retreats, charities and businesses. All lineages (Theravada, Mahayana, Vajrayana and Navayana newer schools) are represented. The following universities in Canada have incorporated Buddhist Studies either as a sub-discipline of religious studies, or as a subsidiary to Asian Studies: the University of Toronto has two professors specialized in Buddhism, and the University of Calgary also maintains two professorships related to Buddhism.  Smaller universities in Canada will typically have just one professor assigned to Buddhism (sometimes the same professor responsible for all Asian Religions) as, e.g., at the U. of Lethbridge.

Although the temples constructed by immigrant communities in the major cities are more visible (e.g., the Sri Lankan Sinhalese "Maha-Vihara" of Toronto), there are also examples of small Buddhist temples constructed by immigrants and refugees in Canada's smaller cities, such as Regina, Saskatchewan's tiny Lao temple.

Various immigrant and refugee populations (Chinese, Tibetan, Thailand, Lao, Japanese, Korean, Burmese/Myanmar, and Vietnamese) have tried to replicate or maintain their traditions in Canada, while small numbers of Canadians of non-Asian ancestry have also been converting to Buddhism. The book Choosing Buddhism by the cultural anthropologist Mauro Peressini provides a survey of the history Buddhism in Canada and documents the conversion to Buddhism of eight notable contemporary Canadian Buddhists including Ajahn Viradhammo, Jim Bedard, Albert Low, Taigen Henderson, Zengetsu Myōkyo, Louis Cormier, Kelsang Drenpa and Tsultrim Palmo.

Demographics
The Buddhist Population in Canada according to the 2011 Census.

The percentage of Buddhists by province/territory in Canada

Prison population
Prison statistics for the year 2011 indicated that 2% of inmates are Buddhist in Canada's federal prison system.

See also

Birken Forest Buddhist Monastery
Chögyam Trungpa
Gampo Abbey
Glenn H. Mullin
International Buddhist Temple
Jodo Shinshu Buddhist Temples of Canada
Ling Yen Mountain Temple
Pema Chödrön
Raymond Buddhist Church
Richard Hayes (professor)
Samu Sunim
Thai Forest Tradition
Diamond Way Buddhism

References

Further reading
 Harding, John, Victor Sogen Hori and Alexander Soucy, Eds. Wild Geese: Buddhism in Canada (2010) 
 Harding, John, Victor Sogen Hori and Alexander Soucy, Eds. Flowers on the Rock: Local and Global Buddhisms in Canada (2014) 
 Matthews, Bruce, Ed. Buddhism in Canada (2006)
 McLellan, Janet Many Petals of the Lotus: Five Asian Buddhist Communities in Toronto (1999)

External links

canadianbuddhism.info 2012 edition of the Sumeru directory of Canadian Buddhist organizations
Sumeru Canadian Buddhist news blog
Early history of Japanese in Canada
Buddhactivity Dharma Centres database
Buddhist Education Foundation for Canada
History of Kampo Gangra Drubgyudling in Toronto
 Westend Buddhist Center
 Canadian Journal of Buddhist Studies

 
Canada